Chris Thredgold (born 8 May 1971) is a former Australian rules footballer who played for Sturt in the South Australian National Football League (SANFL) from 1991 to 2002. He is the co-holder of the record for most years as captain at Sturt, shared with Paul Bagshaw.  A reliable full-back, Thredgold was often described as "the heart and soul of the Double Blues".  As club captain at the time, Thredgold was controversially omitted from the successful 2002 Grand Final team.

In 2014, Thredgold was elected as a board member of the Sturt Football Club in the portfolio of Football Director.

References

External links 

1971 births
Living people
Sturt Football Club players
North Adelaide Football Club players
Australian rules footballers from South Australia
People educated at Prince Alfred College